Disen is a neighborhood divided between the boroughs of Bjerke and Nordre Aker in Oslo, Norway.

Disen was originally a manor south of Grefsenåsen. The name stems from dís in Norse mythology.

Disen farm was parceled out as a residential area from 1918, with a major surge in building construction form the 1950s.

Trams
The Disen tram stop on the Kjelsås Line (Kjelsåsbanen) is served by tram lines 11, 12 and 13. 11 and 12 serve Disen regularly, while 13 serves during rush hour from 0700–1900 and goes to Lilleaker. The trams are all served with the older SL79 trams.

References

Neighbourhoods of Oslo